Saetotenes is a genus of moths belonging to the family Tortricidae.

Species
Saetotenes anguina Diakonoff, 1973
Saetotenes atresta Diakonoff, 1972
Saetotenes deterior Diakonoff, 1974
Saetotenes dimorpha (Diakonoff, 1954)
Saetotenes farinata (Diakonoff, 1954)
Saetotenes infuscata (Diakonoff, 1954)
Saetotenes latenota (Diakonoff, 1954)
Saetotenes megalops (Diakonoff, 1954)
Saetotenes metagrapha (Diakonoff, 1954)
Saetotenes ornithotypa (Meyrick, 1938)
Saetotenes rubiginosa (Diakonoff, 1954)
Saetotenes sitochroma (Diakonoff, 1954)

See also
List of Tortricidae genera

References

External links
Tortricid.net

Tortricidae genera